"Come Get My Love" is the second single from freestyle group TKA's debut album Scars of Love in 1986. The woman on the cover of the single is India, who was a member of the group until the release of this single and then decided to pursue a solo career.
In 1993, the song was released on CD single.

Track listing
US 12"/CD Single

Charts

References

1986 singles
TKA songs
1986 songs